The National Trust of Trinidad and Tobago is managed by an eleven-member Council of different expertise and backgrounds. Five members are elected to the position, and six are ministerial appointments. Its offices are located in Port of Spain in Trinidad.

History
The organization was established in 1991 under the National Trust Act to preserve and safeguard its natural and built heritage. The movement to create the National Trust was begun by members of the Citizens For Conservation (CFC), which includes engineers and architects.

See also
 Indian Caribbean Museum of Trinidad and Tobago
 Magnificent Seven Houses, Port of Spain

References

External links
 National Trust of Trinidad and Tobago (official site)
 Citizens for Conservation, Trinidad and Tobago

History organisations based in Trinidad and Tobago
National trusts
Heritage organizations
1991 establishments in Trinidad and Tobago
Organizations established in 1991